Mikhail Sergeevich Komelkov (12 April 1923 — 25 April 2003) was a Soviet flying ace during World War II. At the end of the war his tally stood at 33 solo and seven shared shootdowns, for which he soon thereafter received the title Hero of the Soviet Union on 27 June 1945.

References 

1923 births
2003 deaths
Soviet World War II flying aces
Heroes of the Soviet Union
Recipients of the Order of Lenin
Recipients of the Order of the Red Banner
Recipients of the Order of Alexander Nevsky
Recipients of the Order of the Red Star